A run batted in or runs batted in (RBI) is a statistic in baseball and softball that credits a batter for making a play that allows a run to be scored (except in certain situations such as when an error is made on the play). For example, if the batter bats a base hit which allows a teammate on a higher base to reach home and so score a run, then the batter gets credited with an RBI.

Before the 1920 Major League Baseball season, runs batted in were not an official baseball statistic. Nevertheless, the RBI statistic was tabulated—unofficially—from 1907 through 1919 by baseball writer Ernie Lanigan, according to the Society for American Baseball Research.

Common nicknames for an RBI include "ribby" (or "ribbie"), "rib", and "ribeye". The plural of "RBI" is a matter of "(very) minor controversy" for baseball fans: it is usually "RBIs", in accordance with the usual practice for pluralizing initialisms in English; however, some sources use "RBI" as the plural, on the basis that it can stand for "runs batted in".

Major League Baseball rules
The 2018 edition of the Official Baseball Rules of Major League Baseball (MLB), Rule 9.04 Runs Batted In, reads:

From 1980 to 1988, the game-winning RBI was an additional statistic used in MLB.

Criticism
The perceived significance of the RBI is displayed by the fact that it is one of the three categories that compose the triple crown. In addition, career RBIs are often cited in debates over who should be elected to the Hall of Fame. However, critics, particularly within the field of sabermetrics, argue that RBIs measure the quality of the lineup more than it does the player himself. This is because an RBI can only be credited to a player if one or more batters preceding him in the batting order have reached base (the exception to this being a home run, in which the batter is credited with driving himself in, not just those already on base). This implies that better offensive teams —and therefore, the teams in which the most players get on base— tend to produce hitters with higher RBI totals than equivalent hitters on lesser-hitting teams.

RBI leaders in Major League Baseball

Career

Totals are current as of October 4, 2022 (regular season). Active player is in bold.
Hank Aaron – 2,297
Albert Pujols - 2,218
Babe Ruth – 2,214
Alex Rodríguez – 2,086
Cap Anson - 2,075
Barry Bonds – 1,996
Lou Gehrig – 1,995
Stan Musial – 1,951
Ty Cobb – 1,944
Jimmie Foxx – 1,922
Eddie Murray – 1,917
Willie Mays - 1,903

Season

Hack Wilson (1930) – 191
Lou Gehrig (1931) – 185
Hank Greenberg (1937) – 183
Jimmie Foxx (1938) – 175
Lou Gehrig (1927, 1930) – 173

Game

 12 RBIs
 Jim Bottomley (September 16, 1924)
 Mark Whiten (September 7, 1993)
 11 RBIs
 Wilbert Robinson (June 10, 1892)
 Tony Lazzeri (May 24, 1936)
 Phil Weintraub (April 30, 1944)
 10 RBIs
 By 11 MLB players, most recently Mark Reynolds on July 7, 2018

Inning

Fernando Tatís (April 23, 1999) – 8
Ed Cartwright (September 23, 1890) – 7
Alex Rodriguez (October 4, 2009) – 7

Postseason (single season)
David Freese (2011) – 21
Scott Spiezio (2002) – 19
Sandy Alomar Jr. (1997) – 19
David Ortiz (2004) – 19

See also

List of Major League Baseball runs batted in records

References

Baseball statistics
Baseball terminology